Rocklahoma (also known as Rock Fever Presents Rocklahoma or Rock Fever) is an annual American three-day rock festival held in Pryor, Oklahoma. The festival features 4 official stages, as well as many unofficial campground parties and performing acts and onsite vendors. It is currently billed as one of the many festivals that make up AEG Entertainment's World's Loudest Month concert series. There were an estimated 100,000 people (about 30,000 per day) at the first annual Rocklahoma held in 2007.
The Third Annual Rocklahoma had over seventy bands on four stages, including favorites from previous Rocklahoma festivals, Beautiful Creatures, LA Guns featuring Tracii Guns, Bang Tango, Lillian Axe, Gypsy Pistoleros and Faster Pussycat. Included on the side stages are bands from all over Europe. 
Coffee table books for Rocklahoma 2007, 2008, 2009 and 2010 have been published and are available on the web.

Rocklahoma saw 2020 get deferred to 2021, when it resumed.

2017 

Thursday, May 25 (Campground Party): Another Lost Year, Nicnos, Locust Grove, Final Drive, Midnight Mob, Hoodslide, Stolen Rhodes, BC & The Big Rig, Reliance Code, Screaming Red Mutiny

Friday, May 26: Def Leppard, Three Days Grace, Skillett, Pierce the Veil, the Pretty Reckless, In Flames, Slaughter, Rival Sons, Fozzy, Badflower, Goodbye June, Aeges, Retrospect All Stars, Lynam, Aska, Electro_Nomicon, Ratchet Dolls, Death Grip, T.R.O.Y., Arson City, Keychain, Sun And Flesh, Thousand Years Wide, Save The Hero, the Normandys, Difuser

Saturday, May 27: Stone Sour, The Cult, Zakk Sabbath, Suicidal Tendencies, Diamond Head, Fuel, Starset, Red Sun Rising, Dinosaur Pile-Up, DED, Kore Rozzik, Dead Metal Society, Wildstreet, Diamond Lane, Black Tora, Five Star Hooker, Moxy & The Influence, Adakain, NonHuman Era, The Mendenhall Experiment, Paralandra, Wild Fire, The Adarna, The Revolutioners, etc

Sunday, May 28: The Offspring, Seether, Jackyl, Ratt, Buckcherry, Taking Back Sunday, Nothing More, Black Stone Cherry, Norma Jean, Wage War, Royal Republic, One Less Reason, London’s Dungeon, Niterain, Nova Rex, 3D In Your Face, The Tip, Desire the Fire, Wild Planes, Coda Cutlass, As Above So Below, The Chimpz, Sweatin Bullets, Weston Horn & The Hush, Skytown, The Fairweather

2016

Thursday, May 26 
Arson City, Even the Dogs, Drek, Nicnos, Emperors and Elephants, Well Hung Heart, Framing the Red, Hoodslide, BC and The Big Rig, Roots of Thought, Grind

2015 

Due to severe weather in the area, Rocklahoma officials were forced to evacuate the grounds and were forced to cancel the remaining artists for Saturday evening; among those cancelled was headliner Linkin Park and Volbeat.

Friday, May 22
Ratchet Dolls, Godsmack, Slayer, Papa Roach, In This Moment, Ministry, Apocalyptica, We Are Harlot, Nonpoint, Young Guns, Butcher Babies, Upon a Burning Body, Like a Storm, Waylaid, Ivy Stone, Even the Dogs, etc. Ruff Justice

Saturday, May 23 
Linkin Park, Volbeat, Halestorm, Anthrax, The Pretty Reckless, Scott Weiland and the Wildabouts, Candlebox, In Flames, Periphery, Starset, Crobot, The Chimpz, etc.

Sunday, May 24 
Tesla, Breaking Benjamin, Queensrÿche, Of Mice & Men, The Winery Dogs, Motionless in White, Aranda, Otherwise, Islander, etc.

2014

Thursday, May 22 
James Douglas Show, DRYVR, Oldman, Motortrain, Blackwater Rebellion, Dirty Crush, Triple Se7en, Severmind, Fight the Fade, Benny’s Little Weasel

Friday, May 23 
Five Finger Death Punch, Deftones, Seether, Killswitch Engage, Hellyeah, Skid Row, Black Stone Cherry, The Pretty Reckless, Thousand Foot Krutch, Lacuna Coil, Nothing More, Truckfighters, Wicked, Killer Dwarfs, London’s Dungeon, Ruff Justice, Loveblast, Firstryke, Nasty Habit, Dellacoma, Chaotic Resemblance, Scattered Hamlet, Jet West, The Chimpz, Sleepwalking Home, Framing the Red, Bad Remedy, Snakefist, NICNOS, Enslaved by Fear

Saturday, May 24 
Staind, Twisted Sister, Jackyl, Filter, Kix, Pop Evil, Adelitas Way, We Are Harlot, Texas Hippie Coalition, Devour the Day, We as Human, Gemini Syndrome, Kill Devil Hill, Ratchet Dolls, Wicked, Black Tora, Bai Bang, ASKA, Hellion, Killer Dwarfs, Ragdoll, Siren, Hip Kitty, Well Hung Heart, Mine Enemies Fall, Vilifi, A Course of Action, The Grizzly Band, The Joint Effect, David Castro Band

Sunday, May 25 
Kid Rock, Theory of a Deadman,  Extreme, Black Label Society, Tom Keifer of Cinderella, Down, Redlight King, Kyng, Butcher Babies, Heaven’s Basement, Eve to Adam, Twelve Foot Ninja, Scorpion Child, Sleepy Hollow, Tempt, Station, Mystery, Lynam, Mandy Lion, Mach22, Down N Dirty, Dirtee Circus, Echofuzz, Shotgun Rebels, Able the Allies, The Bourgeois, Switchbach, Paper Tigers, The Grown Ups

2013

Thursday, May 23

Friday, May 24

Saturday, May 25

Sunday, May 26

Attend/Capacity/Gross Sales: 49.179 / 52.500 / $2,237,936

2012

Thursday, May 24 Pre-Party

Friday, May 25

Saturday, May 26

Sunday, May 27

2011

Thursday, May 26 Pre-Party

Aformatic
Blackwood
Fist of Rage
Floodlyne
Stun
Tiranico

Friday, May 27

Hinder
My Darkest Days
Sick Puppies
Skillet
Texas Hippie Coalition
Jonathan Tyler & the Northern Lights
Whitesnake

Saturday, May 28
Gypsy Pistoleros
Adelitas Way
Drowning Pool
Pop Evil
Rev Theory
Sebastian Bach
Staind
The Gracious Few

Sunday, May 29

Crooked X
Black Label Society
Mötley Crüe
Papa Roach
Pretty Little Suicide
Poison
Saving Abel
Seether

All That Remains, Diemonds, Escape the Fate, Cavo, Hail the Villain, Taddy Porter, New Medicine, Art of Dying, Electric Touch, One Less Reason, Gypsy Pistoleros, Alias, Wildstreet, The Glitter Boys, Gunner Sixx, Black Tora, Mad Max, Aura Surreal, Firstryke, Aska, Arena, Blue Tiger, Bad Things, Cutlass and Mock Star.

2010
On December 1, 2009, Rocklahoma's organizers announced an affiliation with concert promoter AEG Live to revamp the festival's format. The 2010 festival was moved to Memorial Day weekend and included more current artists as well as very few of the 1980s-era classic rock and metal bands for which the festival has been known.

Thursday, May 27 Pre-Party

Friday, May 28

Saturday, May 29

Sunday, May 30

2009 Lineup

Main stage

 Thursday, July 9 

 Anthrax
 Saxon
 Overkill
 Anvil
 Metal Church
 Leatherwolf

 Friday, July 10 
 Ratt
 Night Ranger
 Warrant
 Danger Danger
 Helix
 Hericane Alice

 Saturday, July 11 

 Stryper
 Jackyl
 Thin Lizzy – cancelled due to injury.
 Kix
 Keel
 Lizzy Borden
 Gypsy Pistoleros

 Sunday, July 12 
 Twisted Sister
 Skid Row
 Great White
 Nelson
 Bonfire
 Vixen

+ 3 side Stages brought to you by Retrospect Records

2008 Lineup

Main stage

Over 90 bands appeared on all stages during the 5 days of Rocklahoma.
Sixty bands played on the side stages.

The following bands played the main stage from the Rocklahoma website:

Wednesday, July 9

A benefit concert for residents of the nearby town of Picher, Oklahoma, which was severely hit by an EF4 tornado on May 10, 2008. Three-day ticket holders and members of the armed forces are admitted free of charge, and the general public only has to pay a $25 fee to get in.

 Rock and Roll Fantasy Camp Jam
 Firehouse
 All Star Fantasy Camp
 Jackyl 
 Ratt 
 Heavy Metal in Baghdad (documentary film) 

Thursday, July 10
(pre-party only available to people who purchased three-day tickets)

 Jetboy 
 House of Lords 
 Vain 
 Enuff Z'nuff 
 L.A. Guns w/ Tracii Guns 
 Dokken 
 Sebastian Bach (of Skid Row) 
 Bret Michaels (of Poison) 

Friday, July 11
 XYZ 
 Armored Saint 
 Kingdom Come 
 Living Colour 
 Night Ranger 

 Extreme 
 Triumph reunited with Rik Emmett 

Saturday, July 12
 Pretty Boy Floyd 
 Every Mother's Nightmare 
 Tora Tora 
 Black 'n Blue 
 Trixter 
 Lynch Mob 
 Kix 
 Lita Ford
 Warrant reunited with Jani Lane 
 Cinderella (Cancelled)

Sunday July 13

 Axe 
 Steelheart 
 Zebra 
 UFO 
 Ace Frehley 
 Tesla 
 Queensrÿche

Side Stages
The following bands have been confirmed for the side stages from the Rocklahoma website:

South stage
(sponsored by Nightmare Records, Chavis Records and Blastzone)

Wednesday July 10, 2008

 Joey Doherty "Kid Lightning"
 Pedal Point
 Jaded
 Down Tread
 Overloaded
 Lure

Thursday July 10, 2008
 Bigcock
 Dog's Divin
 Boneshaker
 Cockpit
 Joe Town
 Six Minute Century
 S.E.X. Department
 Powned
 Erocktica

Friday July 11, 2008
 Angelo Minoli
 Gods of Kansas
 Azrael's Bane
 Lipstick Magazine
 Mindflow
 Banshee
 Krucible (Lance King)
 Gypsy Pistoleros

Saturday July 12, 2008
 The Cauze
 Odin
 Order of Nine
 The Jackals
 Lynam
 Asphalt Valentine
 Karnevil (Dario Lorina)
 DeathRiders (featuring Neil Turbin)
 Dirty Penny

Sunday July 13, 2008
 Dangerous Inc.
 Sacred Dawn
 Halcyon Way
 Shadowside
 Warmachine
 Texas Hippie Coalition
 Crooked X
 Bullet Boys

North stage
(sponsored by Retrospect Records)

Thursday July 10, 2008

 Oney
 Gypsy Blue
 Shy Tiger
 Harlow
 Sidekixx
 Sweet F.A. (cancelled)
 Frontrunner
 Pair-A-Dice
 Tommy Had a Vision
 Messano (Bobby Messano of Starz)

Friday July 11, 2008

 Gypsy Blue
 Shy Tiger
 Biloxi
 Whitefoxx (featuring Danny Danzi)
 Blue Tiger
 Wild August
 Valor
 Paul Shortino (of Quiet Riot)
 Mariah

Saturday July 12, 2008
 Kilbourn
 Bad Candy
 Lorraine
 Nasty Nasty
 Cuttlass
 Mass 
 Defcon
 Vyper

Sunday July 13, 2008
 Bad Candy
 Oney
 Strikeforce
 Herazz
 Reckless
 Heartless
 Ron Keel (of Steeler and Keel)
 Warryor
 Real Steel

2007 Lineup 

There were approximately eight bands playing per day for four days at Rocklahoma 2007. These bands were as follows:

Thursday, July 12
 Uro Steppe
 Gypsy Pistoleros
 Hollywood Roses
 Lillian Axe (replaced Tigertailz)
 KISS Army
 US 66
 Off Beat Road

Friday, July 13
 Zendozer
 Greg Leon Invasion
 Dirty Penny (JPOTMUSIC.COM contest winners)
 Mike Tramp's White Lion
 Y&T
 Slaughter
 Quiet Riot
 Ratt
 Poison

Saturday, July 14
 36 Inches
 Down for Five (JPOTMUSIC.COM contest winners)
 Bang Tango
 Bulletboys
 Faster Pussycat
 Enuff Z'Nuff
 FireHouse
 Warrant
 Skid Row
 Winger
 Dokken
 Vince Neil

Sunday, July 15
 Soulrider
 Pedal Point
 Rhino Bucket (JPOTMUSIC.COM contest winners)
 Britny Fox
 Steelheart
 L.A. Guns
 Great White
 Jackyl
 Queensrÿche (replaced W.A.S.P.)
 Twisted Sister

References

External links 
 www.rocklahoma.com
 www.feverfest.com
 www.rocklahomaonline.com
 www.rocklahomabook.com

  

Heavy metal festivals in the United States
Rock festivals in the United States
Tourist attractions in Mayes County, Oklahoma
2007 establishments in Oklahoma